The Women's shot put event  at the 2006 IAAF World Indoor Championships was held on March 11–12.

Medalists

Results

Qualification
Qualifying perf. 18.20 (Q) or 8 best performers (q) advanced to the Final.

Final

References
Results

Shot
Shot put at the World Athletics Indoor Championships
2006 in women's athletics